Starozhilovsky District is an administrative and municipal district (raion), one of the twenty-five in Ryazan Oblast, Russia. It is located in the center of the oblast. Its administrative center is the urban locality (a work settlement) of Starozhilovo. Population: 17,136 (2010 Census);  The population of Starozhilovo accounts for 29.7% of the district's total population.

Notable residents 

Pyotr Gannushkin (1875–1933), psychiatrist, born in the village of Novosyolki 
Vasily Golovnin (1776–1831), navigator and Vice Admiral, born in the village of Gulyniki

References

Notes

Sources

Districts of Ryazan Oblast